Hamilton District Christian High  is an independent Christian day school in Ancaster, Ontario Canada. As a registered private school with the Ontario Ministry of Education the school provides a curriculum that follows Ministry guidelines and standards through a Christ-centred, project-based learning approach. The academic program runs from grade 9 to grade 12.

History 
Established in 1956 by members of the Christian Reformed Church in North America, the student population represents a variety of over twenty different Christian denominations. Approximately 10% of the student body is made up of international students.

Timeline
 1956: Hamilton District Christian High (HDCH) is established inside Calvin Christian School
 1961: HDCH moves to the Athens Street campus
 1989: HDCH builds a new school at Glancaster Road, Ancaster
 2016: Glancaster campus is renovated with the addition of the Grove and the Atrium

Athletics 
HDCH's sports teams are called the Knights, and are particularly strong in soccer, volleyball, beach volleyball, basketball and track and field. In addition, the Knights field teams in hockey, slo-pitch, lacrosse, badminton, ski, snowboard and golf. HDCH participates in the HWIAC and competes in Zone 1 of the Southern Ontario Secondary Schools Association, part of the Ontario Federation of School Athletic Associations. The school is also a member the Ontario Christian Secondary School Athletic Association and competes with member Christian high schools from all over Ontario.

Class projects 
A nine-hold Disc Golf course was designed and built by students on campus in 2017.
Four beach volleyball courts were planned and built at Hamilton District Christian High as a class project in 2018.

References

External links 
Official website

High schools in Hamilton, Ontario
1956 establishments in Ontario
Educational institutions established in 1956